Clarington Municipal Council is the governing body of the municipality of Clarington, Ontario since 1993. There are 7 members on council, including the Mayor and local councillors. The current municipal body was established in 1974 when the Village of Newcastle merged with the town of Bowmanville and the townships of Clarke and Darlington, to form the town of Newcastle. In 1993, the municipality was renamed Clarington. In 1982, terms went from 2, to 3 years in length. Beginning in 2006, terms went from 3 years, to the current 4.

Council meetings are open for the general public to attend.

1991 Special Ballot
In 1991, voters were asked if they wanted to keep the name Town of Newcastle. Residents voted in favour of a name change.

"Are you in favour of retaining the name Town of Newcastle?"
Decided on November 12, 1991

Members

Clarington 
2022–⁠2026 Council
Current council, Elected on October 24, 2022

2018–⁠2022 Council
Elected on October 22, 2018

2014–⁠2018 Council

Elected on October 27, 2014

2010–⁠2014 Council

Elected on October 25, 2010

2006–⁠2010 Council
Elected on November 13, 2006

2003–⁠2006 Council
Elected on November 13, 2006

2000–⁠2003 Council
 
Elected on November 13, 2000

1997–2000 Council
Elected on November 10, 1997

1994-1997 Council
Elected on November 14, 1994

Town of Newcastle 
1991–1994 Council
 
Elected on November 12, 1991

1988–⁠1991 Council
Elected on November 14, 1988

1985–⁠1988 Council
Elected on November 12, 1985

1982–⁠1985 Council
 
Elected on November 8, 1982

1980–1982 Council
Elected on November 10, 1980

1978–⁠1980 Council
Elected on November 13, 1978

1976–⁠1978 Council
Elected on December 6, 1976

1974–⁠1976 Council
Appointed on January 3, 1974

Mayors

Clarington (1993⁠–present)

References 

Clarington
Municipal councils in Ontario
Municipal government of the Regional Municipality of Durham